The Northeastern Intercollegiate Athletics Conference was a college athletic conference that held dual affiliation with the National Association of Intercollegiate Athletics (NAIA) and the United States Collegiate Athletic Association (USCAA). Member institutions were located in Maine, Massachusetts, Pennsylvania, and Maryland in the United States.

History
The NIAC's earlier ancestor was the Sunrise Athletic Conference (SAC), which was formed in 2002 when the Maine Athletic Conference and the Mayflower Conference disbanded in the spring of 2002. Both of these conferences were NAIA conferences of long standing.  The conference membership held steady with nine members until Paul Smith's College and Lyndon State College left in 2010, dropping SAC membership to seven. The conference disbanded in 2011 when the College of St. Joseph, Vermont Technical College and University of Maine at Machias left the conference and the NAIA for the United States Collegiate Athletic Association (USCAA) and the Yankee Small College Conference (YSCC). The University of Maine at Fort Kent, University of Maine at Presque Isle, and SUNY-Canton then left with no regional NAIA competition to become independents in the USCAA. In addition, Maine–Presque Isle (UMPI) transitioned to being a full independent member of NCAA Division III, while SUNY Canton was accepted into the transition process to move from the NAIA to NCAA D-III. Fisher College joined the American Mideast Conference but that conference disbanded in 2012 when many of the members left for NCAA Division II.

Formation of the NIAC
The Northeastern Intercollegiate Athletics Conference was announced in 2016 with a start date set for the 2017–18 academic year. The NIAC due to the lack of conference homes for several independent members of the NAIA as well as USCAA in the New York and New England region.  In October 2016 it was announced that five charter members would form the Northeastern Intercollegiate Athletics Conference.

The NIAC's charter members include College of St. Joseph, Fisher College, State University of New York at Delhi, University of Maine–Fort Kent, and Villa Maria College.  St. Joseph, Maine-Fort Kent, and Villa Maria are all members of the USCAA, while Fisher College is a member of the NAIA. SUNY-Delhi held dual membership in both the NAIA and USCAA until 2017 when it left the NIAC and joined the newly formed American Collegiate Athletic Association in NCAA D-III. St. Joseph left in 2018 to stay exclusively in the USCAA.

Green Mountain College, which joined the NIAC in 2018, left the conference after the 2019 semester when the college announced its closure that year following financial difficulties.

Member schools

Final members

Notes

Former members

Notes

Sports

References

External links

NAIA conferences
United States Collegiate Athletic Association